James Michael (born 1967) is an American record producer and musician.

James Michael may also refer to:

James Lionel Michael (1824–1868), Anglo-Australian solicitor and poet
James Harry Michael Jr. (1918–2005), U.S. federal judge
James Henry Michael, Australian mathematician at the University of Adelaide

See also
James Michaels (1921–2007), American journalist and magazine editor
 James Edward Michaels (1926–2010), Roman Catholic bishop
James Michel (born 1944), President of Seychelles, 2004–2016
James Michels (1918–1982), U.S. Marine photographed raising the U.S. flag during the Battle of Iwo Jima
Jim Michaels (born 1965), American television producer
Jimmy Michael (1877–1904), Welsh world cycling champion
Michael James (disambiguation)